Kalahandi Lok Sabha constituency is one of the 21 Lok Sabha (parliamentary) constituencies in Orissa state in eastern India.

Assembly segments
Before delimitation in 2008, the legislative assembly segments, which constituted this parliamentary constituency were: Khariar, Dharamgarh, Koksara, Junagarh, Bhawanipatna, Narla and Kesinga.

Following delimitation, this constituency currently comprises the following legislative assembly segments:

Members of Parliament
2019: Basanta Kumar Panda , Bharatiya Janata Party
2014: Arka Keshari Deo, Biju Janata Dal
2009: Bhakta Charan Das, Indian National Congress
2004: Bikram Keshari Deo, Bharatiya Janata Party
1999: Bikram Keshari Deo, Bharatiya Janata Party
1998: Bikram Keshari Deo, Bharatiya Janata Party
1996: Bhakta Charan Das, Samajwadi Janata Party (Rashtriya)
1991: Subhash Chandra Nayak, Indian National Congress
1989: Bhakta Charan Das, Janata Dal
1984: Jagnath Patnaik, Indian National Congress
1980: Rasa Behari Behara, Indian National Congress
1977: Pratap Keshari Deo, Independent
1971: Pratap Keshari Deo, Swatantra Party
1967: Pratap Keshari Deo, Swatantra Party
1962: Pratap Keshari Deo, Swatantra Party
1957: Pratap Keshari Deo, Ganatantra Parishad
1952: Giridhari Bhoi, Ganatantra Parishad

Election Results

2019 Election Result

2014 Election Result
In 2014 election, Biju Janata Dal candidate Arka Keshari Deo defeated Bharatiya Janata Party candidate Pradeep Kumar Naik by a margin of 56,347 votes.

2009 Election Result

References

External links
Kalahandi lok sabha  constituency election 2019 date and schedule

Lok Sabha constituencies in Odisha
Kalahandi district
Nuapada district